John Anthony Fetto, II (February 23, 1926 – January 22, 2010), known professionally as Johnny Seven, was an American character actor who appeared in 26 films and approximately 600 television shows during his career, which spanned more than 40 years. His credits included a recurring role as Lt. Carl Reese on the 1968–1975 NBC television series Ironside and the 1960 film The Apartment.

Early life
Seven was born in Bay Ridge, Brooklyn. His parents, who were Italian immigrants, also had five daughters. He began acting and singing as a teenager. He served with the United States Army in the Philippines during World War II and performed with the United Service Organizations (USO). Fetto earned his nickname "Johnny Seven" while serving in the Army and kept it as his stage name following the end of the war.

Career
Seven began his acting career in New York City theater. He portrayed Karl Matuschka, the brother in-law of Shirley MacLaine's character, in The Apartment. In the film, he punches out the character played by Jack Lemmon. His other film credits include The Last Mile (1959), Guns of the Timberland (1960), What Did You Do in the War, Daddy? (1968) and Murder at the World Series (1977). Seven co-wrote, produced, directed, and starred in Navajo Run, his western independent film released in 1964.

On television, in addition to Ironside, he was cast in a  spin-off series, Amy Prentiss. His other television credits included roles on Rescue 8, The Man from Blackhawk, Bonanza, Hennesey, The Everglades, Gunsmoke, CHiPs, Naked City, Mickey Spillane's Mike Hammer, The Phil Silvers Show, Batman (episodes 25 and 26), Death Valley Days, Peter Gunn, The Untouchables, The Rockford Files, The Wild Wild West,The Rookies and Charlie's Angels.

In 1962, he was cast as farmer Carlo Farelli in the episode "The Last Shot" on the syndicated anthology series, Death Valley Days, hosted by Stanley Andrews. In the story line, Carlo eyes saloon singer Della (Grace Lee Whitney as a wife but soon encounters competition from another suitor.

In addition to his acting career, Seven also owned a real estate business in the San Fernando Valley.

Death
Seven died of complications from lung cancer at Providence Holy Cross Medical Center in Mission Hills, California, on January 22, 2010, at the age of 83. He was survived by his wife of sixty years, Edith. and his son, John Anthony Fetto, III, an attorney in Walnut Creek, California. His memorial service was held at St. John Baptist de La Salle Parish in Granada Hills, California, on February 6, 2010.

Filmography

References

External links

 
 
 
 

1926 births
2010 deaths
Male actors from New York (state)
American male film actors
American male television actors
American television directors
Deaths from lung cancer in California
American people of Italian descent
People from Brooklyn
United States Army soldiers
United States Army personnel of World War II
Western (genre) television actors
Catholics from New York (state)